Cucurbitacin E  is a biochemical compound from the family of cucurbitacins. These are found in plants which are member of the family Cucurbitaceae, most of them coming from traditional Chinese medicinal plants, but also in other plants such as pumpkins and gourds.

Cucurbitacin E is a highly oxidated steroid consisting of a tetracyclic triterpene. Specific changes on this molecule under certain conditions can generate other types of cucurbitacins such as cucurbitacin I, J, K and L.

It is being investigated for its potential biological effects.

Research

Anti-inflammatory
Cucurbitacin E anti-inflammatory activities are proved in vivo and in vitro. It is useful in the treatment of inflammation because of the inhibition of cyclooxygenase and reactive nitrogen species (RNS) but not reactive oxygen species (ROS).

Macrophages are responsible for the production of various cytokines, RNS and ROS, growth factors and chemokines as a response to activation signal such as chemical mediators, cytokines and lipopolysaccharide. Although these molecules have an important role, they can also have damaging effects, like some RNS. Cucurbitacin possesses dose-dependent anti-inflammatory activity related to its inhibition of nitric oxide (an RNS) production in macrophages without affecting the viability of these cells.

As cucurbitacin E doesn't affect normal human liver cells, it may have therapeutic potential and effective treatment for a variety of inflammation mediated diseases.

Antioxidant
Cucurbitacin E glycoside has demonstrated antioxidant and free-radical scavenging properties. Its antioxidant and free-radical scavenging properties were measured by the ability of cucurbitacin glycoside combination (CGC), a combination of cucurbitacin B and E glycosides, to reduce ABTS cation to its original form and also the capacity to inhibit MDA formation originated in the oxidation of linoleic acid. Using electron paramagnetic resonance, it was confirmed that CGC had antioxidant properties because of its capacity for scavenging free radicals, such as: superoxide anion (O2-), hydroxyl radical (OH-) and singlet oxygen. Not all natural antioxidants have strong free-radical scavenging properties against multiple free-radicals.

CGC is being investigated as a treatment for human diseases that are linked to oxidative or free-radical damage such as atherosclerosis, cancer, Alzheimer's disease and diabetes.

Cytostatic
Cucurbitacin E is an  inhibitor during the S to M phase in the cell mitosis. It causes a reduction of cell multiplication.

Cytotoxicity 

This triterpene can inhibit the phosphorylation of the cofilin protein, a family of actin-binding proteins that disassembles actin filaments.

Cucurbitacin E shows cytotoxicity to:
	The colon cancer cell line HCT-116
	The lung cancer cell line NCI-H460
	The breast cancer cell lines MCF-7 and ZR-75-1
	The central nervous system tumor cell line SF-268
	The oral epidermoid carcinoma cell line KB
	The cervical cancer cell line HeLa
	The fibrosarcoma cell line HT1080
	The acute leukemia cell lines U937 and HL-60
	The prostate cancer cell lines PC, LNCaP and DU145
	The pancreatic cancer cell line Panc-1
	The ovarian cancer cell line S-2
	The bladder cancer cell line T24
	The hepatic carcinoma cell lines BEL-7402 and HepG2

Anti-angiogenesis 
Cucurbitacin can also inhibit VEGFR2-mediated Jak-STAT3 and MAPK signaling pathways. Anti-angiogenesis property of cucurbitacin E was demonstrated in vitro but also in vivo in a chick embryo chorioallantoic membrane and in a mouse corneal angiogenesis model.

Anti-invasion and anti-metastasis 
In vitro, cucurbitacin E inhibits the adhesion of cancer cells in type I collagen.

Hepatoprotecive effect 
In vitro, cucurbitacin E protects hepatocytes from CCl4 (carbon tetrachloride), by reducing GPT, GOT, ALP, TP and TBIL serums.

Insecticide
Curcurbitacin E has insecticidal effects against the aphid Aphis craccivora.

See also 
 Angiogenesis
 Hepatocyte
 Glycoside
 JAK-STAT signaling pathway

References

External links 
 http://www.chemicalbook.com/ChemicalProductProperty_EN_CB3372306.htm
 https://web.archive.org/web/20120426084358/http://home.ncifcrf.gov/mtdp/Catalog/compounds/106399.html
 http://www.chemblink.com/products/18444-66-1.htm

Further reading 
 
 
 

Steroids